A commander-in-chief is the commander of a nation's military forces or significant element of those forces.

Commander in Chief may refer to:

Commander in Chief (TV series),  American drama about a fictional U.S. President
Commander in Chief (novel), novel by Mark Greaney
Commander in Chief (video game), government simulation game also known as Geo-Political-Simulator
Commander in Chief (horse) (1990–2007), British thoroughbred racehorse
"Commander in Chief" (song), 2020 single by Demi Lovato
The Commander-In-Chief, Norwegian female guitarist
Commander-in-Chief's Trophy, college football competition among the three U.S. service academies
Operation Commander-in-Chief, an operation at Iran-Iraq War

See also
Supreme Commander (disambiguation)